The Silver Slugger Award has been awarded annually since 1980 to the best offensive player at each position in both the American League and the National League, as determined by the coaches and managers of Major League Baseball. 

These voters consider several offensive statistics, including batting average, slugging percentage, and on-base percentage, as well as their "general impressions of a player's overall offensive value". They are not permitted to vote for players on their team.  

The award is a bat-shaped trophy, 3 feet (91 cm) tall, engraved with the names of each of the winners from the league and plated with sterling silver. It is given by Hillerich & Bradsby, the manufacturer of Louisville Slugger bats.

Ten Silver Slugger Awards are given each year per league. One each goes to a catcher, first baseman, second baseman, third baseman, and shortstop. Three outfielders receive the award, irrespective of their specific position; for instance, three left fielders could win the award in a given year. One award goes to a designated hitter (a player who bats in place of the pitcher) and one to a utility player (a player who can play multiple fielding positions). 

Pitchers in the National League received a Silver Slugger Award each year until 2019 and in 2021. In the COVID-shortened  season, the MLB required National League teams to use a designated hitter, so an NL DH received a Silver Slugger Award for the first time. In 2022, MLB began to require both leagues to use the DH. That year also saw the introduction of the utility player award.

Home run record-holder Barry Bonds won 12 Silver Slugger Awards, the most of any player, and won the award in five consecutive seasons twice: from 1990 to 1994, and again from 2000 to 2004. Mike Piazza and Alex Rodriguez are tied for second, with ten each. Rodriguez won seven Silver Sluggers as a shortstop for the Seattle Mariners and Texas Rangers, and three with the Yankees as a third baseman. Wade Boggs leads third basemen with eight awards; Barry Larkin leads shortstops with nine. Other leaders include Ryne Sandberg (seven wins as a second baseman), Mike Hampton (five wins as a pitcher), and Paul Goldschmidt (five wins as a first baseman). David Ortiz has won seven awards as a designated hitter, the most at that position. In 2018, J. D. Martinez collected two Silver Slugger Awards: one as a designated hitter and the other as an outfielder, becoming the only player to win twice in one year. In 2021, Max Fried became the final pitcher to win a Silver Slugger Award.

Key

American League winners

Source:

National League winners

Source:

No award for pitchers was given.

See also

Hank Aaron Award (best hitter in each league)
Edgar Martínez Award: given to the best-designated hitter (American League)
This Year in Baseball Awards (including hitter)
Major League Baseball Triple Crown
List of Major League Baseball awards

Ted Williams Museum and Hitters Hall of Fame

References

External links
All-time winners at MLB.com
Silver Slugger Awards at slugger.com via Wayback Machine

 
Batting (baseball)
Awards established in 1980